"Lego House" is a song by English singer-songwriter Ed Sheeran. It was released on 11 November 2011 as the third single lifted from his debut studio album + (pronounced "plus") of 2011. It was released as the second single in the US on 11 February 2013. It was written by Sheeran, Jake Gosling and Chris Leonard, and produced by Jake Gosling.

The song received its first radio play on Zane Lowe's BBC Radio 1 show on 8 September 2011 and was Sheeran's first song to make the BBC Radio 2 playlist. The remix featuring P Money premiered on MistaJam's BBC Radio 1Xtra show on 30 September 2011. The music video stars Rupert Grint, as a play on his physical resemblance to Sheeran. The song did well worldwide, reaching top five on Australia, Ireland, New Zealand, and the UK Singles Chart, and top fifty on other countries including United States.

Composition

According to the sheet music published by Jordan James EMI Music Publishing, "Lego House" is a bass song written in the key of B major; Sheeran's vocals range from the note of B2 to G#4. Instrumentation is provided by guitar and piano.

Commercial performance
The song peaked at No. 5 in its sixth week on the singles chart in the United Kingdom. As of September 2017, the song has sold 812,000 copies in the United Kingdom, which together with 29 million streams give a total of 1,105,000 in combined units.

Music videos

The music video for "Lego House" was filmed at the Forum, University of Hertfordshire. It stars actor Rupert Grint. It was released on 20 October 2011 on Sheeran's YouTube channel.

The video's narrative seemingly portrays Grint as Sheeran, performing such activities as writing song lyrics on a pad of paper, lounging in his tour bus, and ultimately going onto the stage for a cheering crowd. However, after he takes the stage, security immediately tackles him, and Grint is slowly revealed to be in fact an obsessive fan of Sheeran, and the events of the video turn out to be him stalking the real Sheeran with increasing severity and mental instability (writing the song was transcribing lyrics from the album booklet, and lounging in the bus was him breaking into it). The video ends with the two running into each other as Grint is forcibly removed from the music venue and Sheeran comes out of a lift on his way to perform.

A "Lego-fied" version of the original music video for "Lego House" was released on 11 April 2013 on The Warner Sound's YouTube channel. The video is a shot for shot recreation in LEGO bricks, directed by Shane Ramirez. The music video also got nominated for 2013 MTV Video Music Awards for Best Male Video before losing out to Bruno Mars' "Locked Out of Heaven".

Formats and track listings

Credits and personnel
Lead vocals – Ed Sheeran
Producers – Jake Gosling
Lyrics – Ed Sheeran, Jake Gosling, Chris Leonard
Label – Warner Music Group

Charts

Weekly charts

Year-end charts

Certifications

References

External links
 
 
 
 
 
 

2011 singles
Ed Sheeran songs
Songs about parting
Songs written by Ed Sheeran
Songs written by Jake Gosling
Song recordings produced by Jake Gosling
2011 songs